Opisthotropis zhaoermii, Zhao's mountain stream snake,  is a species of natricine snake found in China.

References

Opisthotropis
Reptiles described in 2017
Reptiles of China